is a molecular pathological epidemiologist, pathologist, and epidemiologist. He is currently Professor of Pathology at Harvard Medical School and  Brigham and Women's Hospital, and Professor in the Department of Epidemiology at Harvard T.H. Chan School of Public Health. He is also Chief of Program in MPE Molecular Pathological Epidemiology at Brigham and Women's Hospital, and an associate member of Broad Institute of MIT and Harvard. He has been known for his work on establishing a new discipline, molecular pathological epidemiology (abbreviated as MPE), which represents an interdisciplinary science of molecular pathology and epidemiology.

Education, training, and positions
Ogino graduated from University of Tokyo School of Medicine, and from University of Tokyo Graduate School of Medicine. He underwent internship at U.S. Naval Hospital Okinawa in Japan from 1994 to 1995. After coming to the United States, Ogino underwent residency training in anatomic pathology and clinical pathology at Allegheny General Hospital (Drexel University) from 1995 to 1997, and at Case Western Reserve University/University Hospitals Case Medical Center from 1997 to 1999. He underwent fellowship training in molecular pathology at University of Pennsylvania Medical Center from 1999 to 2000. After postdoctoral fellowship at University of Pennsylvania, he joined Dana–Farber Cancer Institute, Brigham and Women's Hospital, and Harvard Medical School as Instructor in Pathology in 2001. Ogino was promoted to Assistant Professor in 2004, to Associate Professor in 2008, and to Professor of the institutes in 2015. He received a Master of Science in Epidemiology degree from Harvard T.H. Chan School of Public Health in 2010, and then subsequently obtained a secondary faculty appointment (Associate Professor) in 2012, promoted to Professor at that school in 2015. Ogino became Chief of Program in MPE Molecular Pathological Epidemiology at Brigham and Women's Hospital in 2016, and an associate member of Broad Institute of MIT and Harvard in 2017.

Career in MPE and colorectal cancer research
Ogino proposed that research into molecular pathology with epidemiologic settings should be regarded as a distinct field, and used the term “Molecular Pathological Epidemiology (MPE)” in 2010. Since his proposal, the MPE concept and paradigm have been in widespread use, and MPE has been a subject of international conferences such as American Association for Cancer Research (AACR), Society for Epidemiologic Research (SER), and the American Society of Preventive Oncology (ASPO). The MPE approach aims to elucidate etiology of disease at molecular, individual, and population levels, applying molecular pathology to epidemiology. Utilizing tissue pathology resource and data within existing epidemiology studies, he has been publishing a large number of original articles proving the interrelationship between exposure to risk factors (e.g., environmental, dietary, lifestyle and genetic factors) and molecular pathologic signature of disease (e.g., PIK3CA mutation in colorectal cancer) including some of influential papers in the field, as well as papers which have developed the concepts of MPE. Ogino's discoveries with the MPE approach include the interaction between aspirin use and PIK3CA mutation in colorectal cancer, and the interaction between endoscopy screening and post-colonoscopy colorectal cancer with CIMP and microsatellite instability MSI. He initiated the International Molecular Pathological Epidemiology (MPE) Meeting Series in 2013, and has been serving as the conference chairperson. Its second, third and fourth meetings were held in Boston, in December 2014, May 2016, and May 2018 respectively.

Ogino employed the MPE concept to propose a paradigm shift in colorectal cancer research. His proposal for a transition from the two-colon concept (the proximal and distal colon) to the colorectal continuum model was supported by an observed linear relationship between the location on the colon and Microsatellite instability (MSI), CpG island methylator phenotype (CIMP) and BRAF mutation frequency from the database analyses of over 1,400 colorectal cancer cases. This colorectal continuum model has been supported by others.

Ogino has introduced several new paradigms and research frameworks, including “the GWAS-MPE approach”, “the unique tumor principal”, “the unique disease principle”, “the etiologic field effect model”, "the integrative lifecourse epidemiology - MPE model", “the pharmaco-MPE model” and “the immunology-MPE model”, all of which are related to the field of MPE.

Honors and awards
 2004 Executive Officer's Award, Association for Molecular Pathology (AMP)
 2011 Ramzi Cotran Young Investigator Award, United States and Canadian Academy of Pathology
 2012	    Meritorious Service Award, Association for Molecular Pathology (AMP)
 2014	   The Most Influential Scientific Minds: 2014, by Thomson Reuters
 2014-	   Elected Member, American Society for Clinical Investigation (ASCI)
 2014-	   Member, FASEB Excellence in Science Award Committee
 2015–present NCI R35 Outstanding Investigator Award recipient
 2015, 2016, 2017, 2018, 2019 and 2020 Highly Cited Researchers by Thomson Reuters and Clarivate Analytics
 2018 Outstanding Investigator Award, American Society for Investigative Pathology (ASIP)

References

External links
 Harvard T.H. Chan School of Public Health faculty profile
 The Ogino MPE lab
 Dana-Farber/ Harvard Cancer Center faculty profile
 Brigham & Women’s Hospital faculty profile
 Harvard University faculty directory

Japanese public health doctors
Japanese pathologists
Harvard University faculty
Harvard Medical School faculty
Harvard School of Public Health faculty
University of Tokyo alumni
Living people
Harvard School of Public Health alumni
21st-century Japanese physicians
20th-century Japanese physicians
Year of birth missing (living people)